Seth William Johnson (born September 19, 1998) is an American professional baseball pitcher in the Baltimore Orioles organization.

Amateur career
Johnson attended Jay M. Robinson High School in Concord, North Carolina where he played baseball. After graduating in 2016, he enrolled at Louisburg College. At Louisburg, he played mainly as a shortstop, hitting a combined .254 with nine home runs in his two seasons there. During his career at Louisburg, he pitched a total of six innings. After his sophomore year, he transferred to Campbell University and began focusing solely on pitching. In 2019, his junior year at Campbell, he appeared in 14 games (11 starts), going 3–3 with a 4.61 ERA, striking out 81 batters over  innings.

Professional career

Tampa Bay Rays
The Tampa Bay Rays selected Johnson with the 40th overall pick in the 2019 Major League Baseball draft. He received a signing bonus of $1.72 million and made his professional debut with the Rookie-level Gulf Coast League Rays. After pitching ten scoreless innings over five games, he was promoted to the Princeton Rays of the Rookie Advanced Appalachian League in August, with whom he finished the season, going 0–1 with a 5.14 ERA over seven innings.

Johnson did not play a minor league game in 2020 due to the cancellation of the minor league season caused by the COVID-19 pandemic. He was assigned to the Charleston RiverDogs of the Low-A East for the 2021 season. He appeared in 23 games (making 16 starts), pitching to a 6–6 record, a 2.88 ERA, and 115 strikeouts over  innings. He was assigned to the Bowling Green Hot Rods of the High-A South Atlantic League to open the 2022 season. In late May, he was placed on the injured list with forearm inflammation. It was later announced that he had torn his ulnar collateral ligament in his elbow and would be undergoing Tommy John surgery. Over 27 innings prior to the injury, he posted a 3.00 ERA with 41 strikeouts.

Baltimore Orioles
The Rays traded Johnson to the Baltimore Orioles in a three-team trade on August 1, 2022, in which the Rays acquired José Siri from the Houston Astros, the Astros acquired Trey Mancini from Baltimore and Jayden Murray from Tampa Bay, and the Orioles also acquired Chayce McDermott from the Astros. 

On November 15, 2022, the Orioles selected Johnson's contract and added him to the 40-man roster. Johnson was optioned to the Triple-A Norfolk Tides to begin the 2023 season.

References

External links

Campbell Camels bio

1998 births
Living people
People from Concord, North Carolina
Baseball players from North Carolina
Baseball pitchers
Louisburg Hurricanes baseball players
Campbell Fighting Camels baseball players
Gulf Coast Rays players
Princeton Rays players
Charleston RiverDogs players